Ayoub Azzi (born 14 September 1989 in Ouargla) is an Algerian footballer. He plays primarily for Al-Markhiya as a centre-back but has also been used as a right-back.

Club career
In the summer of 2014, Azzi joined MC Alger, signing a two-year contract with the club.

International career
Azzi made his senior debut with the Algeria national football team in a friendly 2-0 loss to Saudi Arabia on 9 May 2018.

Honours
MC Alger
 Algerian Super Cup: 2014

References

External links
 
 

1989 births
Algerian footballers
Algerian expatriate footballers
Algeria international footballers
Algerian Ligue Professionnelle 1 players
Qatar Stars League players
Qatari Second Division players
MC Alger players
MC Mekhadma players
People from Ouargla
USM El Harrach players
Umm Salal SC players
Al-Arabi SC (Qatar) players
Al-Markhiya SC players
Living people
Association football central defenders
Association football fullbacks
Expatriate footballers in Qatar
Algerian expatriate sportspeople in Qatar
21st-century Algerian people